Sean Porter (born January 12, 1991) is a former American football outside linebacker. He played college football at Texas A&M, and was drafted by the Cincinnati Bengals in the fourth round of the 2013 NFL Draft.

Early years
Porter was born in Schertz, Texas.  He attended Samuel Clemens High School in Schertz, and played high school football for the Samuel Clemens Buffaloes.  He earned first-team all-district (26-4A) honors at linebacker, and was named to the San Antonio Express-News All-Area second-team.  As a junior in 2007, he recorded 137 tackles (85 solo), seven quarterback sacks, an interception, forced two fumbles and recovered three more.  The following season, as a senior in 2008, he tallied 139 tackles, seven sacks, intercepted a pass and recovered a fumble.

Considered a three-star recruit by Rivals.com, he was rated the No. 61 outside linebacker in the nation.  He accepted a scholarship offer from Texas A&M University over offers from Missouri and Houston.

College career
Porter enrolled in Texas A&M University, where he played for the Texas A&M Aggies football team from 2009 to 2012.  As a junior in 2011, he was a first-team All-Big 12 Conference selection.

Career Statistics

Professional career

Cincinnati Bengals
He was drafted by the Cincinnati Bengals in the fourth round (118th overall) of the 2013 NFL Draft.

He signed with the Bengals on May 13, 2013. He spent his entire rookie season on injured reserve. 

On November 30, 2015, he was waived.

Jacksonville Jaguars
Porter was signed to the Jacksonville Jaguars' practice squad on December 7, 2015.

On September 3, 2016, Porter was released by the Jaguars and was signed to the practice squad the next day. He was promoted to the active roster on December 6, 2016. He was promoted on injured reserve on December 27, 2016.

On May 1, 2017, Porter was released by the Jaguars.

San Francisco 49ers
On August 9, 2017, Porter was signed by the San Francisco 49ers. He was released on August 29, 2017.

References

External links
Texas A&M Aggies bio

1991 births
Living people
American football linebackers
Cincinnati Bengals players
Jacksonville Jaguars players
People from Bexar County, Texas
People from Comal County, Texas
People from Guadalupe County, Texas
Players of American football from Texas
San Francisco 49ers players
Texas A&M Aggies football players